The McKnight National Register Historic District is a neighborhood of Springfield, Massachusetts and was one of the first planned residential neighborhoods in the United States. It is one of the city's smallest neighborhoods, at 306.5 acres.

History

In 1870, a group of business people led by brothers William and John McKnight planned the McKnight District as a residential community; most of it was constructed between 1870 and 1900. McKnight was built on land originally considered to be "Un-improvable Pine barrens" when the Springfield Armory and the area around it was laid out in the 1780s.

Economic conditions had changed drastically by 1868 when the horse-drawn streetcars of the Springfield Street Railway first started to run on State Street, to the south of what became the McKnight District.

Neighborhood 
McKnight contains Massachusetts' largest array of Victorian houses outside of Greater Boston. The neighborhood's 900 ornate homes are part of a district listed on the National Register of Historic Places. Much of its western half is also a local historic district, the second largest of Springfield's six historic districts.

Several small decorative open spaces were built by the original developers of the community and still grace the neighborhood.  These include the "Dingle", or McKnight Glen, the Thompson Triangle, three smaller triangles along Bay Street, and the decorative Dartmouth Terrace leading to the McKnight Glen from Thompson Triangle. To the west of the McKnight Section are the Springfield Armory, a portion of which has been preserved as the Springfield Armory National Historic Site, and the Springfield Technical Community College and Springfield's Downtown. I-291 skirts its northern edge, providing easy access to McKnight.

Mason Square 
Mason Square, named for philanthropist Primus P. Mason and formerly known as Winchester Square after Mayor Charles A. Winchester, is the commercial heart of the McKnight District. It features a branch library, the original Indian Motorcycle Company building, American International College, and a monument to the first-ever basketball game on the game's original site at Springfield College. The area acquired its name from the donation of its land specifically for public use by Mr. Mason, whose fortune stemmed not only from his time as a prospector in California but also for his sale of land to the McKnight Brothers for their developments.

External links 

 McKnight Neighborhood Council Website

References

Neighborhoods in Springfield, Massachusetts
Tourist attractions in Springfield, Massachusetts
Architecture in Massachusetts
Queen Anne architecture in Massachusetts
Victorian architecture in Massachusetts